The pink lady is a classic gin-based cocktail with a long history. Its pink color is due to adding grenadine.

Basic recipe and variations 
The exact ingredients for the pink lady vary, but all variations have the use of gin, grenadine, and egg white in common. In its most basic form, the pink lady consists of just these three ingredients. According to the Cafe Royal Cocktail Book of 1937, it is made with a glass of gin, a tablespoon of grenadine, and the white of one egg, shaken and strained into a glass.

Often lemon juice is added to the basic form. Another creamier version of the pink lady that has been around at least since the 1920s adds sweet cream to the basic form. In New Orleans, this version was also known as pink shimmy. In some recipes, the cream is not added to the basic form, but simply replaces the egg white, and sometimes lemon juice is added as well.

Usually the ingredients for any of the versions are shaken over ice, and after straining it into a glass, the cocktail might be garnished with a cherry.

History 

The exact origin of the pink lady is not known for sure. Occasionally its invention is attributed to the interior architect and prominent society figure Elsie de Wolfe (1865-1950), but the recipe associated with her nevertheless clearly differs from the common recipes for the pink lady. The name of the cocktail itself is sometimes said to be taken from the 1911 Broadway musical by Ivan Caryll of the same name, or named in the honour of its star Hazel Dawn who was known as "The Pink Lady". During the prohibition era (1920-1933) the cocktail was already widely known. In those years it was a popular drink at the Southern Yacht Club in New Orleans, where it was offered under the name pink shimmy as well. Its recipe was due to Armond Schroeder, an assistant manager at the club.  The popularity of the pink lady might partially be explained by the frequently poor quality of gin during the prohibition era, due to which there was a need to mask the gin's bad taste.

At the latest in the 1930s the pink lady started to acquire the image of a typical "female" or "girly" drink due to its name and sweet creamy flavor usually associated with a woman's taste in publications like Esquire's Handbook for Hosts (1949). It is said of the Hollywood star and sex symbol Jayne Mansfield, that she used to drink a pink lady before a meal. Subsequently, the cocktail fell out of favour with male cocktail critics, who were put off by its alleged "female" nature. The writer and bartender Jack Townsend speculated in his publication The Bartender's Book (1951) that the very non-threatening appearance of the pink lady may have appealed to women who did not have much experience with alcohol. At one point the pink lady ended up on Esquire'''s list of the ten worst cocktails.

See also
 List of cocktails
 

Notes
 

References

Eric Felten: How's Your Drink?: Cocktails, Culture, and the Art of Drinking Well. Agate Publishing 2007, pp. 120–123 
Salvatore Calabrese: Complete Home Bartender's Guide: 780 Recipes for the Perfect Drink. Sterling Publishing Company 2002, p. 61 
Mary Lou Widmer: New Orleans in the Twenties. Pelican Publishing Company 1993, p. 132 
Daniel R. White: The Classic Cocktails Book. Andrews McMeel Publishing 1998, p. 51 
Rob Chirico: Field Guide to Cocktails: How to Identify and Prepare Virtually Every Mixed Drink at the Bar. Quirk Books 2005, pp. 208–210 
Ted Naigh: Vintage Spirits and Forgotten Cocktails. Quarry Books, pp. 251–252
Anthony Giglio, Ben Fink: Mr. Boston Official Bartender's Guide. John Wiley and Sons, p. 89
Ned Halley: Wordsworth Dictionary of Drink. Wordsworth Editions 2005, p. 461
W. J. Tarling, Frederick Carter: The Cafe Royal Cocktail Book. Pall Mall Ltd., Coronation Edition, London 1937, p. 154
Cherie Fehrman, Kenneth R. Fehrman: Interior Design Innovators 1910-1960. Fehrmann Books 2009, p. 15
Flora K. Scheib: History of the Southern Yacht Club. Pelican Publishing 1986, p. 170
Jessy Randall: "Girl" Drinks. In: Jack S. Blocker, David M. Fahey, Ian R. Tyrrell: Alcohol and Temperance in Modern History: An International Encyclopedia''. ABC-CLIO 2003, Volume 1, p. 267

Cocktails with gin
Cocktails with grenadine
Cocktails with eggs